The bilabial ejective is a type of consonantal sound, used in some spoken languages.

Features
Features of the bilabial ejective:

Occurrence
In addition to the languages listed below, this sound is also a common phonological feature of the Ethiopian Linguistic Area, especially Ethiopian Semitic languages.

See also
Index of phonetics articles

Notes

References

External links
 

Bilabial consonants
Ejectives
Oral consonants